The 1935 Tour de France was the 29th edition of the Tour de France, taking place from 4 to 28 July. Although the French team was favourite, Belgian Romain Maes took the lead in the first stage, and never gave it away. Halfway the race, Romain Maes' biggest threat, Antonin Magne, had to abandon after he was hit by a car.

In the eighth stage, Spanish cyclist Francisco Cepeda fell while he was descending at high speed, and died while he being transported to the hospital.

Innovations and changes
This was the first Tour that had a stage finish and start in a city that was not in France, when Geneva was visited in the fifth stage.

The prize money increased in 1935, and for the first time it was more than one million Francs.

Teams

As was the custom since the 1930 Tour de France, the 1935 Tour de France was contested by national teams. Belgium, Italy, Spain, Germany and France each sent teams of 8 cyclists. Each country also sent four cyclists who rode as individuals, but could take over the place of another cyclist if they dropped out. Spain only sent three cyclists, and Switzerland sent four individual cyclists even though they did not have a national team, so 23 individual cyclists were racing. Finally, there was the touriste-routiers category, in which 30 cyclists participated. In total this made 93 cyclists. Split up in nationalities, there were 41 French, 13 Italian, 12 Belgian, 12 German, 11 Spanish and 4 Swiss cyclists.

The French team looked very strong, as it contained the three winners of the last five Tours, Antonin Magne, Georges Speicher and André Leducq, in addition to climber René Vietto and Maurice Archambaud, who had led the general classification for a long time in 1933. In addition, they had Roger Lapébie and Charles Pélissier riding as individuals, which meant that they could take the place of a French team member dropping out.

Of the other teams, the Belgian and Italian teams seemed most likely to challenge the French.

The teams entering the race were:

 Belgium
 Italy
 Spain
 Germany
 France
 Belgium Individuals
 Italy Individuals
 Spain Individuals
 Germany Individuals
 France Individuals
 Switzerland Individuals

Route and stages

Stages 5, 13, 14, 18, 19 and 20 are retroactively seen as split stages, always between a standard mass-start stage and a time trial stage. In 1935, the mass-start stages were seen as a normal stage, and the time trial stages were not numbered.

Stages 5b, 14b and 18b were individual time trials, while stages 13b, 19b and 20b where team time trials. In the team time trials in 1935, cyclists started together in teams, but unlike current team time trials it was the individual time that counted; the team time trial was not won by a team but by a cyclist.

Race overview

In the first stage, Belgian Romain Maes was lucky as he passed a train crossing just before it closed, while the rest had to wait. Romain Maes was one minute ahead, and although he was chased, the others could not capture him. In the second stage, Romain Maes was less lucky, as several flat tires put him nine minutes behind the peloton. The Belgian team chased for 70 km to get him back with the rest. The stage was won by French sprinter Charles Pélissier. Romain Maes and Charles Pélissier were now ranked first and second, but nobody expected them to remain on top of the general classification.

On the fourth stage, the French team performed poorly; the first French cyclist came in tenth place, and Romain Maes increased his leading margin to over five minutes. In the second part of the fifth stage, Romain Maes performed unexpectedly well, as he lost only 38 seconds to Magne, a time trial specialist. Magne was in second place in the general classification, about four minutes behind Romain Maes.

The sixth stage, the first in the Alps, was perfect for a climber like Vietto, and he indeed took the victory solo. Magne was still about four minutes behind Romain Maes. In the seventh stage, Magne was hit by a car, and had to abandon the race. Later in that stage, Spanish cyclist Francisco Cepeda died after he fell going down the Galibier. One of his tires peeled off his rim, causing him to crash at a high speed. Because Magne was out of the race, Vasco Bergamaschi became the new number two of the general classification, more than twelve minutes behind Romain Maes. In the ninth stage, Bergamaschi lost half an hour, and was out of contention for the victory. René Vietto won the stage, with Francesco Camusso a few seconds behind him. Romain Maes lost almost ten minutes, and Camusso jumped to second place in the general classification, three and a half minutes behind Romain Maes.

In the tenth, eleventh and twelfth stage, Romain Maes won some time on Camusso. The second part of the thirteenth stage was a team time trial, in which the French team beat the Belgian team by 27 seconds, and put Speicher within 9 minutes of Maes in the general classification. In the second part of the fourteenth stage, however, Romain Maes finished in second place, thereby increasing his lead in the general classification to more than ten minutes on Speicher, who had jumped to second place.

The fifteenth stage was fought on the Pyrenees. Belgian cyclists Felicien Vervaecke and Sylvère Maes led and beat the others by minutes. The first three places in the general classification were now all occupied by Belgian cyclists; Romain Maes, Vervaecke and Sylvère Maes.

In the sixteenth stage Romain Maes ran into trouble for the first time in 1935. The Belgian team controlled the race over the first three mountains, but on the fourth, the Aubisque, Italians Ambrogio Morelli and Orlando Teani escaped. Morelli won the stage and took the time bonus, and Romain Maes needed his teammates to keep his losses small. Vervaecke and Jules Lowie helped him to keep it to only six minutes, and Romain Maes was still ahead in the general classification, although only two and a half minute ahead of Morelli.

In the first half of the eighteenth stage, Morelli lost ten minutes. Jean Aerts crossed the finish line first in that stage, but he was set to second place by the jury because he had sprinted irregularly. Maes finished second in the second part of that stage, and increased his lead even more. Initially Jean Fontenay was declared winner of that stage, but he got a penalty of five minutes after the jury found out he had been helped by a car. Romain Maes finished the Tour by escaping in the last stage, and finishing alone in Paris.

Classification leadership and minor prizes

The time that each cyclist required to finish each stage was recorded, and these times were added together for the general classification. If a cyclist had received a time bonus, it was subtracted from this total; all time penalties were added to this total. The cyclist with the least accumulated time was the race leader, identified by the yellow jersey.

For the mountains classification, 15 mountains were selected by the Tour organisation. On the top of these mountains, ten points were given for the first cyclist to pass, nine points to the second cyclist, and so on, until the tenth cyclist who got one point.

The team classification was calculated in 1935 by adding up the times of the best three cyclists of a team; the team with the least time was the winner.
Individuals that ranked higher than team members could be put in the team. This happened with the Belgian team: individual Sylvère Maes ranked higher than the third Belgian team member Jean Aerts, so his time was used for the calculation. If this rule would have not been in place, the French team would have won the team classification. It also happened with the Spanish team, which had only two cyclists left at the end of the race; Spanish individual Vicente Bachero was added to the team. The Italian team had no cyclists left at the end of the race. There were two Italians in the individual category that were then added for the team calculation, but they still lacked a third team member. For that case there was a rule that said that an imaginary cyclist would be added to the team, that had the time of the final cyclist plus one hour penalty time.

Second-placed Morelli was the best cyclist who had started in the "individuals" category, while ninth-placed Ruozzi became the winner of the "touriste-routiers" category. However, in 1935 Morelli was considered to have been included in the Italian team, while Sylvère Maes and Jules Lowie are considered to have been included in the Belgian team, which made Charles Pélissier the best placed individual cyclist.

Final standings

General classification

Mountains classification

Team classification

Aftermath
Felicien Vervaecke, who had finished in third place, felt that he could have won this Tour by more than one hour, if he had not been helping his teammate Romain Maes, when Maes was suffering.

Notes

References

Bibliography

External links

 
1935 in road cycling
1935 in French sport
1935
Tour de France